Susan Edgerley (born 1960) is a Canadian artist known for her installation and sculptural works in glass and mixed media. 

In 2019 she was the recipient of the Saidye Bronfman Award, part of the Canadian Governor General's Awards in Visual and Media Arts.

Her work is included in the collection of the Montreal Museum of Fine Arts and the Musée national des beaux-arts du Québec.

References

21st-century Canadian women artists
20th-century Canadian women artists

1960 births
Living people
Governor General's Award in Visual and Media Arts winners
Canadian glass artists